Al-Ba'aj District is a district in Nineveh Governorate, Iraq. Its administrative center is the city of Al-Ba'aj. Other settlements include Qaryat al-Sakar and Al-Jughaifi. The district is predominantly Sunni Arab.

See also
 Al-Ba'aj

Districts of Nineveh Governorate